The Gothenburg Sports Hall of Fame is a regional hall of fame honouring athletes and leaders from—or associated with—Gothenburg, Sweden. The hall of fame was established in 1999 with the help of a Gothenburg sports museum, where the full hall of fame is exhibited. The first year also presented four honourable mentions. Candidates are selected by an independent jury each year, and the new inductees are unveiled at a Liseberg ceremony.

History
The idea for the hall of fame was conceived by Åke Lindegarth in cooperation with Idrottsmuseet i Göteborg. The hall of fame forms a permanent exhibit in the museum, and each year a ceremony at the amusement park Liseberg presents the new members, who are also covered in the museum's yearbook, Idrottsarvet.

This gross list was assessed by some 60 sports journalists and 50 sports leaders and their results formed the basis for the jury, selecting the original 22 athlete and 13 leader inductees. The jury also selected two sports journalists and two club teams that received honourable mentions.

An additional 18 athletes and leaders were honoured in 2000, since then around five to ten new inductees have selected each year. No new hall of fame members were selected for 2020 as an effect of the COVID-19 pandemic in Sweden, which resulted in reduced activity and a tough financial situation for the museum. The induction of new members was resumed in 2021.

Criteria
The criteria for induction in the hall of fame were defined in 1999 as:
 Must not have participated in their main sport for a minimum of five years
 Must be either born in Gothenburg or have competed or acted in Gothenburg for a minimum of five years
The first criteria regarding end of an active career has later been eased, the chairman of the museum stated in 2019 that the rule had already been relaxed for leaders as "some leaders are leaders for their whole life". By 2021 the waiting period was shortened to three years, and the criteria for persons born outside Gothenburg was also modified to having competed or acted in Gothenburg for a minimum of three rather than five years.

Inductees

List of inductees :

Honourable mentions
List of honourable mentions awarded to journalists :

List of honourable mentions awarded to club teams :

Footnotes

Citations

References

All-sports halls of fame
Halls of fame in Sweden
1999 establishments in Sweden
Awards established in 1999